Malacobdellidae is a monogeneric family within the phylum Nemertea. It is included with the order Hoplonemertea within the class Enopla (formerly in monotypic order Bdellonemertea of the same class).

Morphology
The family, as well as its sole genus Malacobdella, is characterized by a posterior ventral sucker and a proboscis lacking a stylet. As in other Hoplonemertea, the lateral longitudinal nerve cord is located internal to the body wall muscles, in the mesenchyme.

Ecology
Members of Bdellonemertea are all commensal, living in the mantle cavities of bivalves. The only non-marine and non-bivalve hosted species, Malacobdella auriculae, is doubtful. It was described in 1847 by Émile Blanchard on the basis of a single drawing of his colleague and probably wasn't even a nemertean. Malacobdella feed on small food particles that are brought into the mollusk's ctenidia.

References

Hoplonemertea
Nemertea genera